Germeçtepe Dam is a dam in Kastamonu Province, Turkey, built between 1977 and 1984. The development was backed by the Turkish State Hydraulic Works.

See also
List of dams and reservoirs in Turkey

References
DSI directory, State Hydraulic Works (Turkey), Retrieved December 16, 2009

Dams in Kastamonu Province